Charlie Maddison  (born 24 June 1991) is an English rugby union player who plays for Newcastle Falcons in the Premiership Rugby.

Maddison started playing his junior rugby at Tynedale RFC. After school he moved to Leeds where he studied Sports and Exercise Science at Leeds Beckett University, where he played at the university for four years, whilst a part Leeds Carnegie academy. Maddison played for Darlington Mowden Park for a number seasons whilst also at university.

He played for Rotherham Titans who were still in the RFU Championship from 2014-15 season till the end of the 2017-18 season. On 11 May 2018, Maddison left Clifton Lane to join Championship rivals Jersey Reds for the 2018-019 season.

On 27 August 2019, Maddison left Jersey as he signs for Newcastle Falcons on a two-year deal from the 2019-20 season. He made his home debut for Newcastle against Hartpury University at Kingston Park whilst still in the English Championship.

Melt

References

External links
Newcastle Falcons Profile
Its Rugby Profile
Ultimate Rugby Profile

1991 births
Living people
English rugby union players
Jersey Reds players
Leeds Tykes players
Newcastle Falcons players
Rotherham Titans players
Rugby union hookers
Rugby union players from Newcastle upon Tyne